David L. Phillips (born Nov 19, 1938)  was a Massachusetts politician who served as the 51st Mayor of Lynn, Massachusetts.

Notes

Mayors of Lynn, Massachusetts
1938 births
Living people